Jonas Hesselman (9 April 1877- 20 December 1957) was a Swedish engineer. He built the first spark ignition engine with direct injection of fuel into the cylinder.

Biography
Knut Jonas Elias Hesselman  was born at  Å församling in Östergötland, Sweden.
He was the son of factory owner Bror August Hesselman and Marie Louise Hesselman, née Åberg. He was the brother of professor Henrik Hesselman (1874–1943) and linguist Bengt Hesselman (1875–1952).  

Hesselman graduated in 1899 from KTH Royal Institute of Technology, Department of Mechanics.
He  worked from 1899 to 1916 for AB Diesel Engines (later Atlas Diesel, now Atlas Copco) in Sickla in Nacka just outside Stockholm, from 1901 as Head of Construction. Here he also developed Rudolf Diesel's engine further and won international recognition as an authority on diesel engines. In 1916 he opened his own factory and in 1925 presented the Hesselman engine, a hybrid between an Otto engine and diesel engine. 

Jonas Hesselman also designed electrical vehicle components, among others, the motor that became the basis for Hesselman Elhydraulik, now Haldex AB. In 1970, Hesselman Elhydraulik developed the hydraulic power unit that still serves as the prototype for the existing lifts for trucks. 

Jonas Hesselman was a resident of "Villa Hesselman" at  Storängen  outside Stockholm. The villa was designed in 1906 by architect  Albin Brag (1878-1937).  He lived here until his death in 1957.

See also
Diesel engine

References

Other sources 
  (Translated title: Vehicle history of Scania 1891-1991)
Lundeberg, Erik (1931)  Hesselmanmotorn som bilmotor (Stockholm: Dædalus)

External links
Haldex website
 

1877 births
1957 deaths
People from Östergötland
KTH Royal Institute of Technology alumni
Swedish engineers
Members of the Royal Swedish Academy of Sciences
History of the diesel engine
Manufacturing company founders